The Sudeten German county of Bärn during the period between 1938 and 1945. On 1 January 1945 the county included:

 6 towns
 52 more communities

The population of the county on 1 December 1930 was 37,158 inhabitants; on 17 May 1939, 37,121 residents; and 22 May 1947, 25,608 inhabitants.

Literature 
 Heimatbuch Kreis Bärn, Hrsg. Heimatkreis Bärn e. V. Langgöns, Langgöns/Marburg 2005; 328 Seiten.
 Josef Bartoš et al. Historický místopis Moravy a Slezska v letech 1848-1960. Sv. 3, okresy: Olomouc město a venkov, Litovel, Šternberk, Moravský Beroun. Profil, Ostrava 1972.

Weblinks 
 Landkreis Bärn Administrative history on the site: territorial.de (Rolf Jehke), as of 28. August 2013.
 Heimatkreis County Bärn in the Sudeten German Association  
 Population statistics of County Bärn  
 Homeland Association historical summary of County Bärn  
 Information about the towns in the county  
 Cultural collection of artifacts from the county  

 County Bärn